Escaphiella is a genus of spiders in the family Oonopidae. It was first described in 2009 by Platnick & Dupérré. , it contains 36 species found in the Americas.

Species

Escaphiella comprises the following species:
Escaphiella acapulco Platnick & Dupérré, 2009
Escaphiella aratau Platnick & Dupérré, 2009
Escaphiella argentina (Birabén, 1954)
Escaphiella bahia Platnick & Dupérré, 2009
Escaphiella betin Platnick & Dupérré, 2009
Escaphiella blumenau Platnick & Dupérré, 2009
Escaphiella bolivar Platnick & Dupérré, 2009
Escaphiella cachimbo Platnick & Dupérré, 2009
Escaphiella catemaco Platnick & Dupérré, 2009
Escaphiella chiapa Platnick & Dupérré, 2009
Escaphiella cidades Platnick & Dupérré, 2009
Escaphiella colima Platnick & Dupérré, 2009
Escaphiella cristobal Platnick & Dupérré, 2009
Escaphiella exlineae Platnick & Dupérré, 2009
Escaphiella gertschi (Chickering, 1951)
Escaphiella gigantea Platnick & Dupérré, 2009
Escaphiella hespera (Chamberlin, 1924)
Escaphiella hesperoides Platnick & Dupérré, 2009
Escaphiella iguala (Gertsch & Davis, 1942)
Escaphiella isabela Platnick & Dupérré, 2009
Escaphiella itys (Simon, 1893)
Escaphiella litoris (Chamberlin, 1924)
Escaphiella maculosa Platnick & Dupérré, 2009
Escaphiella magna Platnick & Dupérré, 2009
Escaphiella morro Platnick & Dupérré, 2009
Escaphiella nayarit Platnick & Dupérré, 2009
Escaphiella nye Platnick & Dupérré, 2009
Escaphiella ocoa Platnick & Dupérré, 2009
Escaphiella olivacea Platnick & Dupérré, 2009
Escaphiella peckorum Platnick & Dupérré, 2009
Escaphiella pocone Platnick & Dupérré, 2009
Escaphiella ramirezi Platnick & Dupérré, 2009
Escaphiella schmidti (Reimoser, 1939)
Escaphiella tayrona Platnick & Dupérré, 2009
Escaphiella tonila Platnick & Dupérré, 2009
Escaphiella viquezi Platnick & Dupérré, 2009

References

Oonopidae
Araneomorphae genera
Spiders of North America
Spiders of Central America
Spiders of South America